Cheetah is an extended play by British electronic musician Richard D. James, released under the pseudonym Aphex Twin on 8 July 2016 on Warp. The name is a reference to Cheetah Marketing, a British manufacturer of microcomputer peripherals and electronic musical instruments in the 1980s (such as the MS800 namechecked in two of the EP's track titles).

Release
In 2015, Richard D. James uploaded several tracks with names like "Cheetah3 Teac" and "CHEETAHT7" to his SoundCloud 'user18081971' account; these have since been removed.

A flyer teasing the EP release was sent to various record shops in the UK in early June 2016. The flyer parodies the luxurious writing style of 1970s adverts. The album was announced on 9 June, with James tweeting a link to a website for the EP.

The Cheetah EP was made available on vinyl, CD, cassette and a digital download in various digital formats, including MP3, WAV and FLAC.

A video for "CIRKLON3 [Колхозная mix]" was released on 21 June. The video was James' first since the Chris Cunningham-directed video for "Windowlicker" in 1999 and was directed by 12-year-old Ryan Wyer. James and Warp commissioned Wyer to direct the video after James discovered Wyer's "epic1:40d Gaming" YouTube channel.

Reception

At Metacritic, which assigns a normalised rating out of 100 to reviews from mainstream critics, Cheetah received an average score of 74, based on 11 reviews. Writing for Exclaim!, Daryl Keating gave the album muted praise, calling it "fine but unremarkable, especially when pitted against the behemoths of his back catalogue."

Accolades

Track listing
All tracks were written & produced by Richard D. James.

"2X202-ST5" is contained on the CD, cassette and digital download editions and is included as a download available with the vinyl editions.

Personnel
Credits adapted from Cheetah liner notes
 Richard D. James – producer, writer
 Beau Thomas – mastering
 The Designers Republic – artwork

Charts

References

2016 EPs
Aphex Twin EPs
Warp (record label) EPs